Switzerland competed at the 1924 Summer Olympics in Paris, France. 141 competitors, 136 men and 5 women, took part in 74 events in 17 sports.

Medalists

Aquatics

Diving

A single diver represented Switzerland in 1924. It was the nation's second appearance in the sport.

Ranks given are within the heat.

 Men

Swimming

Ranks given are within the heat.

 Men

Water polo

Switzerland made its second Olympic water polo appearance.

 Roster
 Charles Biefer
 Armand Boppart
 Henri Demiéville
 Robert Girod
 Charles Kopp
 Albert Moret
 Fernand Moret
 P. Renevier
 H. Rich
 René Ricolfi-Doria
 Robert Wyss

First round

Athletics

Seventeen athletes represented Switzerland in 1924. It was the nation's fifth appearance in the sport. Martin and Schärer each won a silver medal—Switzerland's first medals in Olympic athletics.

Ranks given are within the heat.

Boxing 

Seven boxers represented Switzerland at the 1924 Games. It was the nation's second appearance in the sport. Stauffer became the first Swiss boxer to reach the quarterfinals.

Cycling

Nine cyclists represented Switzerland in 1924. It was the nation's debut in the sport. The Swiss were perhaps the most successful nation not to win a medal; Blattmann took fifth in the individual time trial, the Swiss team took fourth in the team time trial, and Mermillod reached the semifinals of the sprint.

Road cycling

Track cycling

Ranks given are within the heat.

Equestrian

Nine equestrians represented Switzerland in 1924. It was the nation's debut in the sport. Gemuseus led the jumping team to a strong debut, taking the individual gold and propelling the team to a silver medal. The eventing team placed fourth.

Fencing

Ten fencers, seven men and three women, represented Swtizerland in 1924. It was the nation's third appearance in the sport; Switzerland was one of nine nations to send women to the first Olympic women's fencing competition.

 Men

Ranks given are within the pool.

 Women

Ranks given are within the pool.

Football

Switzerland competed in the Olympic football tournament for the first (and, as of 2008, only) time in 1924. The Swiss took the silver medal, losing the final to Uruguay.

 Round 1

 Round 2

 Quarterfinals

 Semifinals

 Final

Final rank

Gymnastics

Eight gymnasts represented Switzerland in 1924. It was the nation's fourth appearance in the sport, and first since 1904. The team took bronze. Güttinger, the top all-around individual at seventh place, won two apparatus medals: the gold in the parallel bars and the bronze in the rope climbing. Gutweninger had a pair as well, with silvers in the horizontal bar and the pommel horse. Wilhelm (gold) and Rebetez (bronze) had one medal each, as the Swiss swept the pommel horse medals, with Widmer finishing fourth as well.

Artistic

Rowing

11 rowers represented Switzerland in 1924. It was the nation's second appearance in the sport. All five of the Swiss boats won medals, including two golds and three bronzes.

Ranks given are within the heat.

Sailing

A single sailor represented Switzerland in 1924. It was the nation's second appearance in the sport, and first since 1900. Switzerland had the only female sailor in 1924.

Shooting

Seven sport shooters represented Switzerland in 1924.

Tennis

 Men

Weightlifting

Wrestling

Freestyle wrestling

 Men's

Greco-Roman

 Men's

References

External links
Official Olympic Reports
International Olympic Committee results database

Nations at the 1924 Summer Olympics
1924
1924 in Swiss sport